Hygrocybe flavescens is a species of Hygrocybe described from Michigan. It is considered nonpoisonous to humans. The species can be found in various forests and woodlands.

The mushroom is yellow-orange. Its cap ranges from 2.5 to 6 cm wide, and can be more orange in youth. The stalk is 4 to 7 cm long, .5 to 1.5 cm wide. The gills are more pale than the cap and stipe. The spores are white, elliptical, smooth and inamyloid. It has a mild taste and odor.

Hygrocybe chlorophana is similar, noted in North America as having a more viscid stipe. This distinction is not made in Europe, indicating that they may be the same species.

References

External links
 
 

flavescens
Fungi of the United States